Frydenlund is a surname. Notable people with the surname include:

Bård frydenlund (born 1972), Norwegian historian
Knut Frydenlund (1927–1987), Norwegian diplomat and politician
Olaf Frydenlund (1862–1947), Norwegian rifle shooter
Richard Frydenlund (1891–1981), Norwegian wrestler
Thorbjørn Frydenlund (1892–1989), Norwegian wrestler